André Gaspar Murta (born 8 August 1994) is a Portuguese professional tennis player who currently competes on the ITF Men's Circuit. In September 2016, he achieved a career-high singles world ranking no. 480.

He is the brother of Inês Murta who is also a tennis player.

Career finals

ITF Men's Circuit

Singles: 4 (1 title, 3 runners-up)

Doubles: 10 (6 titles, 4 runners-up)

ITF Junior Circuit

Singles: 1 (0 titles, 1 runner-up)

Career earnings

* As of 10 April 2017.

National participation

Davis Cup (1 win, 0 losses)
Gaspar Murta debuted for the Portugal Davis Cup team in 2013 and has played 1 match in 1 tie. His singles record is 1–0 and his doubles record is 0–0 (1–0 overall).

   indicates the result of the Davis Cup match followed by the score, date, place of event, the zonal classification and its phase, and the court surface.

See also

Portugal Davis Cup team

References

External links

1994 births
Living people
People from Faro, Portugal
Portuguese male tennis players
Sportspeople from Faro District
21st-century Portuguese people